Elisa Christian Galvé (July 20, 1922 in Buenos Aires – October 20, 2000 in Rome) was an Argentine actress. She was best known for her roles in films in the 1940s and 1950s, during the Golden Age of Argentine cinema.

She made her film debut in 1939 in the film Caras argentinas, and made her last film appearance in Dos en el mundo in 1966. She starred in the acclaimed Silver Condor-winning 1943 film Juvenilia.

Selected filmography
 Three Men of the River (1943)
 Wake Up to Life (1945)
 White Horse Inn (1948)

References

External links
 
 

1922 births
2000 deaths
Argentine film actresses
People from Buenos Aires
20th-century Argentine actresses
Argentine expatriates in Italy